Nelson Zuinglius (or "Zwinglius") Graves (1849–1930) was an American businessman, best known for his role in developing Cape May, New Jersey.

Early life
Graves was born August 24, 1849 in Clinton, North Carolina; his father was Luke C. Graves, principal of the Clinton Female Institute. Graves was named after his uncle, a minister who ran a similar school for girls in Warrenton, North Carolina. After attending Davidson College in North Carolina for a time, Graves graduated from Middlebury College in Middlebury, Vermont in 1868 and was at first employed as a professor of languages in Maryland. He later took classes at Columbia Law School, but then went into business.

Business career
Around 1882 Graves began to manufacture varnish and japan, and in 1888 he incorporated the N. Z. Graves Company in Philadelphia, which manufactured varnish, japan, and pigments. Other ventures included the Camden White Lead Works and lead mines at Tecopa, California. By 1906, Graves was wealthy enough that when the Presbyterian church that he had attended in North Carolina as a young man burnt down, he donated a new church building to the congregation, named after his father.

In 1897 Graves purchased a vacation "cottage" in Cape May, New Jersey. In 1910 a consortium led by Graves purchased the local power company. In 1911 Graves took over the Cape May Real Estate Company, a financially troubled effort to develop a resort community there. The Hotel Cape May had opened in 1908 but had not been successful enough to pay back its enormous construction cost overruns, and lots nearby were largely unsold. Graves built a home in the southwestern Mission style there, which is now an inn. He also opened an amusement park and casino named the Fun Factory there in 1912; by 1917 it was closed and sold to the United States Coast Guard and is today the United States Coast Guard Training Center Cape May. Graves also controlled the Cape May, Delaware Bay, and Sewell's Point Railroad, a shortline railroad which brought passengers and freight into Cape May. He founded a large farming operation called the Cape May Farmstead to provide high quality produce, eggs, and milk to the hotel and for sale. By 1915 Graves was forced to declare bankruptcy, although he was able to refinance his operations and regain control of most of his business empire several years later. He continued to advance the company's projects as late as 1922, arranging the dredging of Cape May harbor. An obituary referred to Graves as "the father of Cape May" for his role in developing the area.

Family and death
Graves married Ida C. Johnson (1850-1939) in 1874; their children were Nelson Z. Graves, Jr. (1880-1918), Ferdinand J. Graves (1875-1941), and Lottie Graves. Nelson Jr. played international cricket in his younger years and helped run the family business, but he died young of meningitis. Ferdinand was also involved in the family business.

Graves died December 6, 1930 at his home in Philadelphia, two weeks after suffering a fall. He and his family are buried in West Laurel Hill Cemetery in Bala Cynwyd, Pennsylvania.

References

1849 births
1930 deaths
People from Clinton, North Carolina
Middlebury College alumni
Businesspeople from Philadelphia
Cape May, New Jersey